Fripp & Eno is a musical side-project composed of Brian Eno and Robert Fripp. The duo have released four studio albums, beginning with the 1973 album (No Pussyfooting). The music created by this pair is entirely instrumental and has made extensive use of Frippertronics, a tape delay technique, combined with Fripp's guitar, the Fripp Pedalboard and Frizzbox (with subsequent sound treatments by Eno) along with Eno playing various keyboards, synthesizers and modified Revox A77 tape recorders.

In 2015, Fripp & Eno were ranked No. 17 on Rolling Stone's list of the 20 Greatest Duos of All Time.

Discography

Studio albums
(No Pussyfooting) (1973)
Evening Star (1975)
The Equatorial Stars (2004)
Beyond Even (1992–2006) (2007) - also known as The Cotswold Gnomes

Compilation albums
(No Pussyfooting)/Evening Star bundle - first released as a Double Pack Cassette in the UK & US, later as a limited edition box set in 2008 in Japan
The Essential Fripp and Eno (1994)

Live album
May 28, 1975 Olympia Paris, France (2011)

References

British ambient music groups
Electronic music duos
Rock music duos
Brian Eno
Robert Fripp
Island Records artists
E.G. Records artists